The following lists events that happened in 1940 in Iceland.

Incumbents
Monarch - Kristján X
Prime Minister – Hermann Jónasson

Events

Births

11 January – Örn Steinsen, footballer
15 September – Rannveig Guðmundsdóttir, politician.
16 September – Ómar Ragnarsson, media personality
11 December – Fríða Á. Sigurðardóttir, writer (d. 2010)

Deaths

References

 
1940s in Iceland
Iceland
Iceland
Years of the 20th century in Iceland